Joyce Howard Barrell (née Gedye; 26 November 19176 December 1989) was an English composer. She was born in Salisbury, Wiltshire, England, and was educated at Leicester University, studying with Benjamin Burrows and Harold Craxton for piano and Grace Burrows for violin. After completing her studies, Barrell worked as composer and as a guitar teacher and piano accompanist. She married composer Bernard Clements Barrell in 1945. From 1939 until her death she composed about ninety works. She died in Ipswich, England.

Selected works
Barrell composed mainly chamber music and music for children. Selected works include:
Dialogues for flute and viola da gamba
Three Fours for viola and piano, Op.45 (1986)
The Hacheston Quintet for 2 violins, viola, cello and piano, Op.67a (1988)
What am I?, 6 Songs for children's chorus and piano, Op.68
Serenade for saxophones, Op.92
Nightmare for soprano, clarinet and piano, Op.93; words by Stephen Coates

References

1917 births
1989 deaths
20th-century classical composers
British music educators
Women classical composers
English classical composers
20th-century English composers
People from Salisbury
20th-century English women musicians
Women music educators
20th-century women composers